The Turkish Football Federation (TFF) is the governing body of association football in Turkey. It was formed on 23 April 1923, and joined FIFA the same year and UEFA in 1962. It organizes the Turkey national football team, the Turkish Football League and the Turkish Cup.

Governed competitions

Leagues

The Turkish football league system is divided into eight tiers, ranging from the top-tier Süper Lig to local amateur divisions.

Cups

The Turkish Cup changed its name to the Federation Cup (Turkish: Federasyon Kupası) in the 1980–81 season, then back to Turkish Cup in 1992–93.

Hosting bids

Turkey has had several unsuccessful bids to host the UEFA European Championship.

Turkey submitted a joint bid with Greece for UEFA Euro 2008, which failed. Their bid for UEFA Euro 2012 was also unsuccessful, with the competition going to Poland and Ukraine. The federation also submitted a bid to host UEFA Euro 2016, but on May 28, 2010, UEFA announced that Euro 2016 would be hosted by France. France beat bids of Turkey (7-6 in voting in second voting round) and Italy, which had the fewest votes in the first voting round. Turkey were also bidding for UEFA Euro 2024, competing against Germany. Germany were announced the hosts on September 27, 2018 at the UEFA headquarters in Nyon, Switzerland.

Turkey had already hosted the 2005 UEFA Champions League Final and the 2009 UEFA Cup Final in Istanbul. At the youth-level, they hosted the UEFA European Under-17 Football Championship in 2008, after first hosting the event back in 1993.

Competition summary
As of May 2019

Presidents

See also
 List of Turkish football champions
 Football in Turkey

References

Video references

External links

 
Turkish soccer
 Turkey at FIFA site
 Turkey at UEFA site

 
1923 establishments in Turkey
Sports organizations established in 1923
Football
Football in Turkey
Futsal in Turkey
UEFA member associations